The Women's omnium at the European Track Championships was first competed in 1997.

The Omnium event, consists of a combination of different disciplines, sharing similarities with other multi-event sports such as Modern Pentathlon, heptathlon and decathlon. The make up of the event has fluctuated since its introduction, as the event has been tweaked. In its most modern version, the event operates as an extended points race for endurance riders over one day – points are won in the first three disciplines (a scratch, tempo and elimination race) and these points are then brought forward to the final event, the points race. Timed elements that formally were part of the race, such as the flying lap, kilo and individual pursuit, have gradually been removed so that all four elements are now mass start.

Medalists
The women's omnium has been contested since before the advent of the full European Track championships, but can be broadly divided between a pre-Olympic event, and the Olympic event. For two years, a separate 'Omnium sprint' event was also held.

The most successful cyclist in the event before its Olympic inclusion was Olga Slyusareva who took six titles in seven years for Russia between 1998 and 2005. Following its Olympic inclusion, double-Olympic champion Laura Kenny holds the record for four titles and two silver medals, with Katie Archibald her closest challenger with three titles and a silver. The Great Britain pairs dominance' is notable, as each nation can, as is common in such events, only enter one athlete – as such, Kenny and Archibald have never faced each other at European level. Only Dutch racer Kirsten Wild with two titles, three silvers and a bronze has more than one title win outside these three.

Omnium endurance
The discipline exists of a points race, an individual pursuit, a scratch race and an elimination race.

Omnium sprint
The discipline exists of a flying lap, a keirin, an elimination race and a sprint.

Omnium Olympic
The individual disciplines of the event have changed over time. Initially consisting of a flying lap, a points race, an elimination race, an individual pursuit, a scratch race and a time trial, since 2016 the discipline consists of a scratch race, a tempo race, an elimination race, leading to a final deciding points race.

References

2010 Results
2011 Results
2012 Results
Results from cyclingarchives.com

 
Women's omnium
Women's omnium